Brachiopod Mountain was named by James F. Porter for the fossil brachiopods found in the Devonian limestone of the mountain. It is located in the Slate Range, a subset of the Canadian Rockies in Alberta, Canada.

Climate

Based on the Köppen climate classification, Brachiopod Mountain is located in a subarctic climate zone with cold, snowy winters, and mild summers.

See also

 List of mountains of Canada
 Geology of Alberta

References

External links
Brachiopod Mountain photo: Flickr

Two-thousanders of Alberta
Mountains of Banff National Park
Alberta's Rockies